Vladimir Ivanovich Zhdanov (29 April 1902 – 19 October 1964) was a colonel-general of tank troops in the armed forces of the Soviet Union. He was a major general in the Soviet Red Army during World War II.

Military career
In 1941, Zhadanov became  the Assistant Commandant of the Syzransk Tank School. He attended the Military Academy of the General Staff from 1941 to 1942. From 1942 to 1944 he was the Chief of Staff of the 13th Tank Corps. He commanded the 4th Guards Mechanized Corps in 1944 and 1945. From 1945 to 1947 he was the Commanding Officer of the 5th Guards Mechanized Division. He then commanded the 6th Guards Mechanized Division from 1947 to 1949. He attended the Military Academy of the General Staff in 1950 and 1951. He was the Chief of Staff of the Far Eastern Military District until 1953. From 1951 to 1953 he was also the Assistant Commander in Chief of the Far Eastern Military District. He also served as the Deputy Commander in Chief of the Southern Ural Military District and the Soviet Central Group of Forces. He was also the First Assistant Commander in Chief of the Transbaikal Military District. From 1961 to 1964, he was the Senior Military Adviser to the East German Army. In 1964, he was the Commandant of the Military Academy of the Tank Forces in the Soviet Union.

He was a recipient of the Hero of the Soviet Union Award.

Belgrade Offensive

He was the commander of the 4th Guards Mechanized Corps in 1944 during the Belgrade Offensive. This unit captured Belgrade on October 20, 1944. He was awarded the medal Order of the People's Hero of Yugoslavia. Two streets were also named after him in Belgrade.

Death

He died on October 19, 1964, when his plane crashed at Avala while he was to attend the 20th anniversary of the Soviet liberation of Belgrade on October 20, 1944. Soviet Marshal Sergey Biryuzov was also killed in the crash.

Legacy 
Resavska Street in downtown Belgrade was named after him from 1946 to 1951 and then again from 1965 to 1997. In 2010, an initiative was launched to name a street in the Novi Beograd or New Belgrade section of Belgrade after him. In 2016, the city manager of Belgrade, Goran Vesić, announced that the Belgrade Assembly or Skupstina had accepted the initiative and a street in the New Belgrade section of the city, formerly Pohorska Street, was renamed General Zhdanov Street. Goce Delcev Street was renamed Marshal Tolbukhin Boulevard to commemorate Fyodor Tolbukhin.

References

Sources
 Biryuzov, Sergei S. Sovetskii soldat na balkanakh [Soviet soldiers in the Balkans]. (In Russian). Moskva: Voenizdat, 1963.
 Biryuzov, Sergeĭ Semenovich, and Rade Hamović. Beogradska Operacija. (In Serbian). Beograd: Vojni istoriski institut Jugoslovenske narodne armije, 1964.
 Erickson, John. The Road to Berlin: Continuing the History of Stalin’s War with Germany. Boulder, Colorado: Westview Press, 1983. pp. 379–390.
 Medvedev, Zhores A., and Roy A. Medvedev. The Unknown Stalin: His Life, Death and Legacy. London: I.B. Tauris, 2003. p. 212-214.
 Tolubko, Vladimir F. Ot Vidina do Belgrada: istoriko-memuarnyĭ ocherk o boevykh deĭstvii͡akh sovetskikh tankistov v Belgradskoĭ operat͡sii. (In Russian). Moscow, 1968.

1902 births
1964 deaths
Burials at Novodevichy Cemetery
Heroes of the Soviet Union
Recipients of the Order of the People's Hero
Russian people of World War II
Soviet military personnel of World War II
Victims of aviation accidents or incidents in Serbia
Victims of aviation accidents or incidents in Yugoslavia
Soviet colonel generals
Military personnel from Kyiv
Recipients of the Order of Lenin
Recipients of the Order of the Red Banner
Recipients of the Order of Suvorov, 1st class
Recipients of the Order of Suvorov, 2nd class
Recipients of the Order of Kutuzov, 2nd class
Soviet military personnel of the Russian Civil War